HMS Allington Castle was one of 44  built for the Royal Navy during the Second World War. She was named after Allington Castle in Kent. Completed in 1944, she served as a convoy escort during the war and on fishery patrol duties in 1945–1947, being sold for scrap in 1958.

Design and description
The Castle-class corvette was a stretched version of the preceding Flower class, enlarged to improve seakeeping and to accommodate modern weapons. They were powered by a pair of triple-expansion steam engines, each driving one propeller shaft using steam provided by two Admiralty three-drum boilers. The ships' complement was 99 officers and ratings.

The Castle-class ships were equipped with a single QF  Mk XVI gun forward, but their primary weapon was their single three-barrel Squid anti-submarine mortar. This was backed up by one depth charge rail and two throwers for 15 depth charges. The ships were fitted with two twin and a pair of single mounts for  Oerlikon light AA guns. Provision was made for a further four single mounts if needed. They were equipped with Type 145Q and Type 147B ASDIC sets to detect submarines by reflections from sound waves beamed into the water. A Type 277 search radar and a HF/DF radio direction finder rounded out the Castles' sensor suite.

Construction and career
Allington Castle was laid down by Fleming and Ferguson at their shipyard at Paisley, Scotland, on 22 July 1943 and launched on 29 February 1944. She was completed on 19 June and served as a convoy escort until the end of the Second World War in May 1945. The ship was placed in reserve on 25 May. Allington Castle was reactivated in November and assigned to the Fishery Protection Flotilla based at Fleetwood. In 1947 she returned to reserve. The ship was sold and arrived at Sunderland on 20 December 1958 to be broken up.

Citations

Bibliography
 
 
 
 
 

 

Castle-class corvettes
1944 ships
Ships built on the River Clyde